The Plaza de America (Seville, Spain), located in the Parque de María Luisa, is flanked by the Museum of Popular Arts (Neomudéjar style) to the north, the Archaeological Museum (Neo-Renaissance style) to the south, and the Royal Pavilion (Gothic style) to the east. These three buildings were built by the architect Aníbal González between 1913 and 1916 for the future Ibero-American exhibition in 1929, each with a different architectural style. Also form Part of the roundabout of Miguel de Cervantes, adorned with the works Ceramics Recalling Most Famous, as Rodriguez Marin.

Buildings and roundabouts in the Plaza de América

 Royal pavilion
 Roundabout of Cervantes
 Roundabout of Rodriguez Marín
 Museum of Popular Arts ( Mudéjar Pavilion )
 Archaeological Museum
 Source of the Doves
 Mural Glorieta de la Mesa
 Roundabout Clock
 Roundabout of Virgen de los Reyes

Plazas in Spain
Tourist attractions in Seville